Olga Krasilnikova  was a Russian woman who disguised herself as a man to fight in World War I. In 1915, she participated in nineteen battles in Poland, before being returned to Moscow because of a leg wound. She was decorated with the Cross of St. George.

References
Salmonson, Jessica Amanda.(1991) The Encyclopedia of Amazons. Paragon House. Page 144. 

Krasilnikov, Olga
Krasilnokov, Olga
Krasilnokov, Olga
Russian military personnel of World War I
Krasilnokov, Olga
Krasilnokov, Olga